Din Tur ('your trip') is the operating name of Västernorrlands läns Trafik AB, the principal operator of local public transport for the county of Västernorrland in northern Sweden. It is a joint operation of the county government in conjunction with the seven municipalities of Sundsvall, Härnösand, Kramfors, Ånge, Sollefteå, and Örnsköldsvik, and services are contracted out to private companies including Busslink, Nobina Sverige, Transdev and several local operators.

Din Tur's services include local buses within the county's major cities and towns, and long-distances services connecting them. These are supplemented through co-operation with public transport authorities in the neighbouring counties of Jämtland, Norrbotten, Västerbotten, and Gävleborg, and by passenger trains operated by Norrtåg, X-Trafik, and the national railway SJ.

External links
 Din Tur official web site 

Public transport authorities of Sweden
Transport in Västernorrland County